Derbyshire County Cricket Club is one of eighteen first-class county clubs within the domestic cricket structure of England and Wales. It represents the historic county of Derbyshire. Its limited overs team is called the Derbyshire Falcons in reference to the famous peregrine falcon which nests on the Derby Cathedral (it was previously called the Derbyshire Scorpions until 2005 and the Phantoms until 2010). Founded in 1870, the club held first-class status from its first match in 1871 until 1887. Because of poor performances and lack of fixtures in some seasons, Derbyshire then lost its status for seven seasons until it was invited into the County Championship in 1895. Derbyshire is also classified as a List A team since the beginning of limited overs cricket in 1963; and classified as a senior Twenty20 team since 2003. In recent years the club has enjoyed record attendances with over 24,000 people watching their home Twenty20 fixtures in 2017 – a record for a single campaign. The local derby versus Yorkshire at Chesterfield now regularly sells out in advance.

The club is based at the County Cricket Ground, previously known as the Racecourse Ground, in the city of Derby. In 2006, for the first time in eight years, county cricket returned to Queen's Park, Chesterfield with a County Championship game against Worcestershire and a one-day league game against Surrey. Other first-class cricket grounds used in the past have included Buxton, Saltergate in Chesterfield, Heanor, Ilkeston, Blackwell, Abbeydale Park in Sheffield, Wirksworth and Burton upon Trent (3 grounds), which is actually in neighbouring Staffordshire. One-day matches have been played at Darley Dale, Repton School, Trent College, Leek, Staffordshire and Knypersley (also in Staffordshire).

History

Earliest cricket in Derbyshire
Cricket may not have reached Derbyshire until the 18th century. The earliest reference to cricket in the county is a match in September 1757 between Wirksworth and Sheffield Cricket Club at Brampton Moor, near Chesterfield.

Origin of club
The formation of Derbyshire County Cricket Club took place on 4 November 1870 at a meeting in the Guildhall, Derby. The Earl of Chesterfield, who had played for and against All-England, was the first President, G. H. Strutt was vice-president and Walter Boden, who had campaigned for the club's foundation for three years, was secretary. Also present at the meeting was Boden's brother, Henry. When Chesterfield died the following year, William Jervis became president.

Derbyshire's opening season was 1871 when the club played its initial first-class match versus Lancashire at Old Trafford Cricket Ground on 26 and 27 May 1871 and joined the (then unofficial) County Championship.

Club history

Although the club had some good results in its early seasons, it struggled for the most part and before the 1888 season, following a run of disastrous results, Derbyshire was demoted from first-class status, which was then based on the number of matches against other teams of similar standing. Derbyshire recovered first-class status in 1894 and rejoined the County Championship in 1895.

Although the county then had a quite strong team due to the bowling of George Davidson, Joseph Hulme and George Porter and the batting and wicket-keeping of William Storer, William Chatterton and Bagshaw, within three years they had hit rock-bottom, going through 1897 without a win due to their best bowlers losing their powers.

From this point up to 1925, Derbyshire were perennially among the weakest counties, losing every single match in 1920 despite the efforts of Sam Cadman and Arthur Morton, persevering professionals. From 1926, the nucleus of a good team emerged around some doughty batting from Denis Smith, Stan Worthington and George Pope. Pope's bowling and that of his brother Alf, leg spinner Tommy Mitchell and seam bowler Bill Copson took the team to their one and so far only Championship victory in 1936. They won 13 of their 28 matches outright and five on first innings. Worthington, Les Townsend, Smith and Alderman all passed 1,000 runs and Copson and Mitchell took over 100 wickets, with Alf Pope taking 94. Charlie Elliott, who later became a Test umpire and selector, was another member of this team which was captained by AW Richardson.

There have been more downs than ups in post-war years. Though runs came regularly from Arnold Hamer and less consistently from the West Indian Laurie Johnson and captain Donald Carr, the batting remained the weak point right up to the beginning of covered pitches in the 1980s. However, a series of seam bowlers served England as well as Derbyshire. The list began with Copson and continued with Cliff Gladwin, Les Jackson, Harold Rhodes, Alan Ward, Mike Hendrick and, most recently, Devon Malcolm and Dominic Cork. Spin was in short supply apart from the steady work of Edwin Smith and the under-rated all-rounder Geoff Miller, the current national selector of the England team and noted after-dinner speaker. The signing of Eddie Barlow, the famous South African, in 1976 and the lengthy period under the captaincy of Kim Barnett, starting in 1983, meant the side were rarely uncompetitive.

Derbyshire were crowned County Championship Division Two champions in 2012 after securing a 6-wicket victory over Hampshire on the final day of the season at the County Ground, as Karl Krikken's side won promotion after securing more wins over the course of the season than Yorkshire who also finished the campaign on 194 points.

After the conclusion of the 2013 season, Derbyshire announced a new Elite Cricket Performance model in the next phase of the club's quest for sustainable on-field success across all three domestic competitions, combined with the desire to produce England cricketers. Former Derbyshire bowler Graeme Welch was appointed the new Elite Cricket Performance Director in January 2014.

Honours

 County Championship (1) – 1936
Division Two (1) – 2012
 Sunday/Pro 40/National League (1) – 1990
 Gillette/NatWest/C&G/Friends Provident Trophy (1) – 1981
 Benson & Hedges Cup (1) – 1993

Ground history
This following table gives details of every venue at which Derbyshire have hosted a first-class, List A or Twenty20 match:

Players

Current squad
 No. denotes the player's squad number, as worn on the back of their shirt.
  denotes players with international caps.
  denotes a player who has been awarded a county cap.

Records

Most first-class runs for Derbyshire 
Qualification – 15,000 runs

Most first-class wickets for Derbyshire 
Qualification – 1,000 wickets

Derbyshire recorded their highest ever score, 801 for 8 declared, against Somerset at Taunton in 2007. Their score beat their previous highest ever score of 707 for 7 declared also against Somerset at Taunton in 2005. Simon Katich scored 221, Ian Harvey 153, Ant Botha 101 and James Pipe 106. Derbyshire broke the record despite losing Phil Weston and Chris Taylor to Andy Caddick in the first over without a run on the board.

References

Further reading
H S Altham, A History of Cricket, Volume 1 (to 1914), George Allen & Unwin, 1962.
Derek Birley, A Social History of English Cricket, Aurum, 1999.
Rowland Bowen, Cricket: A History of its Growth and Development, Eyre & Spottiswoode, 1970.
Roy Webber, The Playfair Book of Cricket Records, Playfair Books, 1951.
Playfair Cricket Annual – various editions.
Wisden Cricketers' Almanack – various editions.

External links

Official Derbyshire County Cricket Club website
CricInfo's Derbyshire section

 
English first-class cricket teams
History of Derbyshire
Sport in Derby
Cricket in Derbyshire
Cricket clubs established in 1870
1870 establishments in England